Stubborn Youth Soccer Club is an association football club from Stubbs, St. Vincent and the Grenadines currently playing in the SVGFF South East Division, one of twelve regional leagues in the country. The team previously played in the NLA Premier League having qualified for the CFU Club Championship in 1997.

History
Founded in Stubbs, Stubborn Youth play their home games on the Stubbs Playing Field to a capacity of 1,000. A sporting ground usually used for cricket matches. In 1997 Stubborn Youth SC qualified for the CFU Club Championship after finishing as runners-up of their domestic league. In their first International tournament, facing off with SV Transvaal (Suriname), Seba United (Jamaica) and Club Franciscain (Martinique) the club lost all of their matches in the group stage making an early exit from the competition.

In 2000 the club won the South East Regional Championship in St. Vincent and the Grenadines.

Achievements
South East Regional Championship: 1
2000

Performance in CONCACAF  competitions

CFU Club Championship
CFU Club Championship: 1 appearance
Titles:None

1997 CFU Club Championship
Group Stage v.  Transvaal – 0:1
Group Stage v.  Seba United – 1:5
Group Stage v.  Club Franciscain – 2:3

References

External links
St. Vincent and the Grenadines Football Federation

Football clubs in Saint Vincent and the Grenadines